Blood Scent is STEMM's fourth full-length album and first on new record label Catch 22 Records. It was released on November 11, 2008, almost exactly three years since their prior release, which was on November 15, 2005. The album is the first to feature the band's new line-up with original member Alex Scouten taking over guitar duties while former guitarist Joe Cafarella handles full-time vocals for the first time. The first single from the album has been announced as "Awake," the song also has an accompanying video that was produced by GDM Video Production company. The first 1,000 albums sold will also feature a DVD, STEMM's first ever, that will document several aspects of the band and the recording process for Blood Scent. During a recent interview, vocalist Joe Cafarella talked at length about the new album, saying 

The band was sending their second single "House of Cards" to rock radio on August 10, 2009. "House of Cards" would later be featured in EA Sports MMA.
This was also the last album to feature bassist Stephen Crowl since his first STEMM album was Songs for the Incurable Heart. He was replaced by Mario Nobilio in 2011 who appears in STEMM's final album Crossroads.

Track listing
"Blood Soaked" - 5:21
"House of Cards" - 4:49
"One King Down" - 3:52
"Awake" - 3:47
"The Devil Walks Among Us..." 4:30
"Broken Face Masterpiece" - 3:22
"As Real As it Gets" - 5:02
"Wish" (N.I.N. Cover) - 5:00
"Beneath My Skin" 4:51
"Never Will I Break" 3:28
"Casualty for Prayer" - 12:04

Personnel
Joe Cafarella - vocals, guitar
Stephen Crowl II - bass, backing vocalist
Alex Scouten - guitar, backing vocals
Dan Nelligan - drums

Guest musicians
Mike Hatalak - Guitar on "Blood Soaked"
Bruce Wojick - Slide guitar on "House of Cards"
Judah Nero - Harmonies on "Beneath My Skin"
T.J. Frost - Ending vocals on "Casualty for Prayer"
Ruth Ann Davis - Samples on "Wish"

References

2008 albums
STEMM albums